Pijimi is a 4th-century Coptic saint, a native of Fisha (modern Beheira Governorate), diocese of Masil.

According to Coptic manuscripts, an angel appeared to Pijimi at the age of 12 and asked him to become a monk. Pijimi agreed and went to the desert of Scetes, where he dwelt with a number of monks for 24 years until they all departed.

Subsequently, Pijimi left that place and went into the inner desert, a distance of three days travel. Having overcome the devils' conspiracies against him, he lived in a valley inside the desert for three years, fasting a week at a time. At the end of each week, he would eat a handful of dates and drink some water. According to Coptic sources, he once fasted for 80 days, to the point that his skin cleaved to his bones.

After years of living in the inner desert, Pijimi returned to his city of Feesha and built a small cell on its outskirts. He dwelt there alone, devoting himself to worshiping and asceticism. He became a good model and a good example for everyone who saw him, and people came to him to be nourished with his spiritual teachings.

Coptic sources say that Saint Shenouda the Archimandrite once saw an exceedingly shining pillar and heard a voice telling him "This is Abba Pijimi." Thus, Shenouda went to visit him for a number of days.

Following a short illness, Pijimi departed at the age of 70 on 11 Koiak.

References
 http://www.copticchurch.net/classes/synex.php?id=101

Saints from Roman Egypt
Egyptian hermits
Egyptian Christian monks
4th-century Christian saints
Angelic visionaries